Denis Gauthier, Jr. (born October 1, 1976) is a Canadian former professional ice hockey defenceman. A first round selection of the Calgary Flames at the 1995 NHL Entry Draft, Gauthier played for the Flames, Phoenix Coyotes, Philadelphia Flyers and Los Angeles Kings during his ten-season National Hockey League (NHL) career.

Playing career
Gauthier played four seasons of major-junior hockey with the Drummondville Voltigeurs of the Quebec Major Junior Hockey League.  He holds the franchise record for most goals by a defenceman in one season, 25, and had his number 21 retired by the Voltiguers in 2009.

Known for his big open-ice hits, this physical, defensive player was the Calgary Flames' first-round draft pick, 20th overall, in the 1995 Entry Draft. He made his NHL debut in 1997 and quickly established himself as a powerful presence on the blue line.

He played only the first round of the Flames' 2004 playoff run after suffering a knee injury in Game 6 against the Vancouver Canucks. He later underwent surgery on his anterior cruciate ligament on May 21.

In the 2004 off-season, he was traded to the Phoenix Coyotes in a deal also involving Daymond Langkow and Oleg Saprykin. During the 2006 trade deadline, Gauthier was traded to the Philadelphia Flyers for Josh Gratton and 2 second round draft picks. Prior to the 2007-08 season, Gauthier was waived by the Flyers and was assigned to the Philadelphia Phantoms. He spent the entire season with the Phantoms, and following the season was waived again on June 30, 2008. The following day, he was traded along with a 2010 second round draft pick to the Los Angeles Kings for Patrik Hersley and Ned Lukacevic.

On February 2, 2009, Gauthier was suspended for five games for a high elbow head shot to Montreal Canadiens defenseman Josh Gorges. On February 21, 2009, Gauthier was suspended for two games for boarding on an icing call to San Jose Sharks captain Patrick Marleau.

Awards
QMJHL: 
Emile Bouchard Trophy, 1995–96
First Team All-Star, 1995–96

Canadian Hockey League
First Team All-Star, 1995–96

IIHF U20 World Championship
Gold Medal, 1995–96

Personal life
Gauthier's father, Denis Sr., was a professional wrestler, and his mother Joanne is the sister of former wrestlers Jacques, Armand and Raymond Rougeau. His nephew Julien Gauthier was drafted by the Carolina Hurricanes.

Career statistics

Regular season and playoffs

International

See also
Rougeau wrestling family

References

External links

 

1976 births
Living people
Calgary Flames draft picks
Calgary Flames players
Canadian ice hockey defencemen
Drummondville Voltigeurs players
French Quebecers
Los Angeles Kings players
Ice hockey people from Montreal
Philadelphia Flyers players
Philadelphia Phantoms players
Phoenix Coyotes players
Saint John Flames players